Engineers Australia (EA) is an Australian professional body and not-for-profit organisation whose purpose is to advance the science and practice of engineering for the benefit of the community. Engineers Australia is Australia's recognized organization for accreditation of professional engineering qualifications under the Washington Accord. As of 2022, EA has 115,000 members, which includes 31,000 students.

History
The association began after World War I, following recognition of the need for a single body to represent engineers, rather than multiple smaller associations. The first council meeting of this single body was held in 1919, electing Professor William Warren of the University of Sydney as the first President. This formed The Institution of Engineers Australia. On 1 May 1926 the Institution was incorporated as a company limited by guarantee. Twelve years later, on 10 March 1938 His Majesty King George the Sixth granted a charter of incorporation to the Institution, reconstituting it as a body corporate and politic by Royal Charter.

The Institution of Engineers Australia is now known as Engineers Australia (EA). Engineers Australia wholly owns two subsidiaries, Engineering Education Australia and EngInsure. Engineers Australia previously had a publishing subsidiary Engineers Media which published the organisation's main magazine. Engineers Media ceased operations at the end of August 2015 after the magazine "create" was outsourced to a commercial publisher, Mahlab Media.

Membership
Membership is open to a variety of occupations. Membership is a requirement to seek credentials such as "Chartered".

Membership types
Engineers Australia has the following membership types:
 Student: free for students studying engineering
 Graduate: for people who have completed an accredited or recognised engineering qualification
 Member: same as graduate but with 3 years experience in industry
 Fellow: same as member but with evidence of eminence

Occupational categories
The occupational categories are: 
 Professional engineer, hold a 4-year engineering degree
 Engineering technologist, hold a 3-year engineering degree
 Engineering associate, hold a 2-year advanced diploma or associate engineering degree
 Engineering manager, for overseas engineers whose qualifications don’t fit one of the three other categories

Membership for non-engineers
 Affiliate: open to people who don't hold formal engineering qualifications, but have an active interest in the engineering profession
 Companion: same as an Affiliate, with evidence of eminence

Credentials and other statuses
 Chartered: In Australia, the Chartered credential the highest available technical credential for a member, and is exclusive to Engineers Australia. Chartered is nationally and internationally recognised.
 Honorary Fellow: same as Fellow, a person who has rendered conspicuous service to the Australian People, or in recognition of outstanding achievement, or is a distinguished person as determined by the Board of EA. Honary Fellows must be living, and there is a cap of 200.

Notable Fellows
Notable Fellows  of Engineers Australia include:

 Derek Abbott
 Rose Amal
 Eliathamby Ambikairajah
 Matt Barrie
 Walter Bassett
 Bill Bradfield
 Ted Brown
 Guillermo Capati
 Branko Celler
 Ross Dunning
 Alan Finkel
 Julie Hammer
 Donald Hector
 Malcolm Kinnaird
 David Knox
 John Moore
 Andrew Parfitt
 Karen Reynolds
 David James Skellern
 Chandreshekar Sonwane
 Alex Zelinsky

Migration skills assessment
Engineers Australia is the designated assessing authority for engineering occupations as listed by the Department of Immigration and Border Protection.

Governance

The National Congress is a representative body of some 35 members, which elects and monitors the Board of Engineers Australia. The responsibilities and structure of National Congress are determined by the Royal Charter and By-laws. The Board is Engineers Australia's governing body. It has six members and its role is comparable to that of a company board. It appoints and liaises with the Chief Executive Officer, sets regulations and policies, sets strategic directions, and monitors the organisation's financial sustainability and performance. Each of Engineers Australia's nine divisions is led by a division committee of the division members. A division committee is responsible to and under the direction of the Board. A division group delivers specific services to the members of the Division, within a specific field of practice, area of interest or geographic area. Each of Engineers Australia's nine colleges is led by a College Board of the college members. College Boards are under the direction of the Board.

The patron of Engineers Australia is the Governor-General of Australia, David Hurley.

Regulatory schemes
There is no formal system of regulation for engineers throughout Australia. Engineering services are regulated under a variety of Acts in ad hoc areas, many of which relate to engineers in the building and construction industry. There are also many pieces of subordinate legislation, such as regulations, by-laws and orders-in-council that impose various prescriptive standards and incur unnecessary costs to the engineering industry in complying. In Queensland, persons who are not registered with the Board of Professional Engineers Queensland are prohibited from offering or providing professional engineering services. The only exception is for individuals who practise under the direct supervision of registered professional engineers.

Registers

State register
Queensland is currently the only Australian jurisdiction to apply a comprehensive registration system for engineers. The Queensland Minister for Public Works and Information and Communication Technology appointed Engineers Australia on 1 July 2008 as one of the Approved Assessment entities for assessing applicants for Registration with the Board of Professional Engineers of Queensland.

National register
The National Engineering Register (NER) has been created by Engineers Australia to provide a means of presenting registered engineers and their services to the public. It also provides assurance to consumers that engineers engaged from the NER meet the high standards of professionalism expected in the engineering profession. It is the largest Engineering Register in the country delivering a uniform national benchmark standard of professionalism in the broadest areas of engineering practice, both general and special.

The NER is a publicly searchable database providing a national system of ‘registration’ for the engineering profession in Australia of professional engineers, engineering technologists and engineering associates in both the private and public sectors. It is expected that the NER will facilitate access to existing State/Territory registers and to new registers, as and when they are developed. The NER is aimed at removing any current inconsistencies across State/Territory jurisdictions.

The NER caters for nine (9) general and ten (10) special areas of practice aligned to demonstrated professional competence and experience.  Registration on the 10 special areas of practice will be restricted to Chartered members of Engineers Australia and registrants who have successfully completed Engineers Australia's Chartered assessment process.

Registrants on the NER will be able to confirm the following eligibility criteria. the remaining

 A recognised qualification
 Relevant professional practice
 Currency of continuing professional development (CPD)
 The benefit of Professional Indemnity Insurance (PII)
 A commitment to ethical practice

International register
Chartered members of Engineers Australia can apply to join the:
 Asia-Pacific Economic Cooperation (APEC) register 
 International Professional Engineers Agreement (IPEA) register
The APEC register allows use post-nominals APECEngineer and the IPEA allows the use of the post-nominals IntPE(Aus).

Continuing professional development
The Board expects Chartered Members and Registrants to maintain records of continuing Professional Development (CPD) activities that extend or update their knowledge, skill or judgment in their area or areas of engineering practice. An individual's CPD records must demonstrate a minimum of 150 hours of structured CPD in the last three years. To maintain Chartered Status, registrants must complete Continuing Professional Development (CPD), which is subject to review every five years.

Code of ethics
Since its inception, Engineers Australia has had a Code of Ethics and disciplinary processes that enable it to take action against members who breach that Code. The membership by-laws require the professional regulation of members.

Chartered members and registrants on the various registers are specifically required to practice in accordance with the Code of Ethics.

Sustainability
Engineers Australia believes that sustainable development is development that meets the needs of the present without compromising the ability of future generations to meet their own needs.

Complaints - professional conduct
Engineers Australia has a detailed and regulated process for handling complaints against members and office bearers. Complaints against members of Engineers Australia are handled in accordance with Division 4 of the General Regulations 2016. If the person is not a member, then Engineers Australia has no authority to commence an investigation or take any action regarding the person's professional conduct. Engineers Australia is also not able to offer legal advice in relation to contractual or common law disputes or criminal matters and the complaints process will not result in financial restitution or compensation.

Position statements
One of Engineers Australia's core activities is to make its position known on policies, inquiries and other government initiative. Engineers Australia draws upon the intellectual capital of the membership of Engineers Australia when drafting position statements and developing submissions.

Annual report and financials
In accordance with By-law 20.2, an Annual Report is presented by the Board each year for the business of the Annual General Meeting of Engineers Australia.

Lobbying
Engineers Australia engages third-party political lobbyists in various jurisdictions. For example, in South Australia, Engineers Australia engages MCM Strategic Communications.

Publications
Create magazine was introduced on 12 August 2015. It is a magazine that showcases the profession, achievements, impacts and future thinking of engineering. EHA Magazine is published quarterly covering industrial and engineering heritage first published in December 2013.

Engineering heritage recognition program 

Engineering Heritage Australia, a special interest group within Engineers Australia, runs a program that recognises historically significant engineering works. Such works have a plaque on display, with a brief summary of the significance of the work. The program was established in 1984 with two categories of awards, "National Engineering Landmark" and "Historic Engineering Marker". In 2009 these were renamed "Engineering Heritage National Landmark" and "Engineering Heritage Marker"; in 2011 and 2012 the awards were renamed and a third category added. The current awards are:

 Engineering Heritage Marker
 Engineering Heritage National Marker
 Engineering Heritage International Marker
 there were 222 registered sites. Lists of the sites are available from Engineers Australia's web site.

Awards
Since its formation in 1919, EA have been conferring awards. This role was enshrined in a Royal Charter, granted in 1938. In 1950, the Board created Engineers Australia’s General Prize Fund. Today it is called the Engineers Australia Excellence Awards

The Peter Nicol Russell Memorial Medal is the most prestigious award conferred by Engineers Australia. It is presented each year for notable contribution to the science and/or practice of engineering in Australia.

The Professional Engineer of the Year is the most prestigious national Engineering award given to a practicing engineer for his or her exceptional contributions to Engineering in the evaluated year. Each major city branch of Engineers of Australia first selects the best professional engineers in the city and surroundings and some of these winners are nominated for the national award, and the national winner is selected by a national committee of Engineers Australia.

See also
 Amalgamated Engineer Union
 Australasian Society of Engineers

References

External links
Official web site

Engineering societies based in Australia
Organizations established in 1919
1919 establishments in Australia